The Puducherry Munnetra Congress, formerly known as the Pondicherry Munnetra Congress, (PMC or புமுக) is a political party in India active in the Union Territory of Puducherry. It was formed by P. Kannan on 11 May 2005. Its symbol is the bell.

The party holds 3 seats in the Puducherry Legislative Assembly which they won during the 2006 elections with All India Anna Dravida Munnetra Kazhagam (AIADMK) as its ally.

During the general election of 2009, the party switched camps and now supports the Indian National Congress.In September 25,2019  he floated a new political party – Makkal Munnetra Congress (MMC).

References

See also
Indian National Congress breakaway parties

Political parties in Puducherry
Political parties established in 2005
2005 establishments in Pondicherry
2011 disestablishments in India
Political parties disestablished in 2009
Indian National Congress breakaway groups
Populist parties
Recognised state political parties in India
Social democratic parties in India
State political parties in Puducherry